India: Kingdom of the Tiger is a 2002 IMAX documentary, based on the writings of Jim Corbett. The film was directed by Bruce Neibaur. It depicts man-eating tigers and the conservation efforts of the tiger in India.

Plot
The plot is loosely connected to the documental stories published in Jim Corbett's 1944 bestselling book Man-Eaters of Kumaon. The narrator of the film is Jim Corbett (portrayed by Christopher Heyerdahl)

Corbett is asked to kill a man-eating tiger, which has killed a young woman in Kumaon. Corbett arrives at Kumaon and meets with local people. The sister of the victim (portrayed by Mishra Smriti) takes Corbett to the killing site. They together ambush the man-eater and Corbett kills the tiger from the machan. During this plot, the narration (by Corbett) contains stories of the history of India and the Kumaon region, as well as the efforts to save Indian tigers.

Cast
 Christopher Heyerdahl as Jim Corbett
 Mishra Smriti as the Indian woman who assists Corbett

Filming
The filming took place in Canada and in India, using IMAX technology.

Soundtrack
The film score for India: Kingdom of the Tiger was composed and produced by respected ambient guitarist and world musician Michael Brook. The score was recorded at the Lavenderia and Real World Studios.  Rahat Fateh Ali Khan and Lakshmi Shankar contributed vocals to the project.

The soundtrack album was released by Four Winds Trading Company in 2002. Bruce Neibar, the film director, wrote the following lines in the soundtrack album:  "From almost my first day of work on India--Kingdom of the Tiger I was worried about the music...being heavy-handed....  Michael Brook has created a score that has washed away all my worries and concerns. He has masterfully painted in the rich, magical shades of India that are so important to the story. His music, from its very first notes, transports us into that faraway land. When the film is finished, I believe audiences will be wishing they could stay there longer."

See also
 Conservation

References

External links
 

2002 films
2002 short documentary films
Canadian short documentary films
Indian short documentary films
Documentary films about nature
English-language Canadian films
Films scored by Michael Brook
Films about tigers
Films based on non-fiction books
Films set in Uttarakhand
Films shot in British Columbia
Films shot in India
IMAX documentary films
IMAX short films
Tigers in India
Films set in India
English-language Indian films
2000s Canadian films